The 2016 Burnley Borough Council election took place on 5 May 2016 to elect members of Burnley Borough Council in England. This was on the same day as other local elections. One third of the council was up for election, with each successful candidate serving a four-year term of office, expiring in 2020. These seats were last contested in 2012.

Labour remained in overall control of the council.

State of the Parties 
After the election, the composition of the Council was as follows:

Results

By ward

Bank Hall ward

Briercliffe ward

Brunshaw ward

Cliviger with Worsthorne ward

Coalclough with Deerplay ward

Daneshouse with Stoneyholme ward

Daneshouse with Stoneyholme returned a Labour Party (UK) councillor unopposed in 2015.

Gannow ward

Gawthorpe ward

Hapton with Park ward

Lanehead ward

Queensgate ward

Rosegrove with Lowerhouse ward

Rosehill with Burnley Wood ward

Trinity ward

Whittlefield with Ightenhill ward

References

2016 English local elections
2016
2010s in Lancashire